Halimede , or Neptune IX, is a retrograde irregular satellite of Neptune. It was discovered by Matthew J. Holman, John J. Kavelaars, Tommy Grav, Wesley C. Fraser and Dan Milisavljevic on August 14, 2002.

Name

Halimede, like many of the outer satellites of Neptune, is named after one of the Nereids, the fifty daughters of Nereus and Doris. Before the announcement of its name on February 3, 2007 (IAUC 8802), Halimede was known by the provisional designation S/2002 N 1.

Orbit

Halimede has the second most eccentric and third most inclined orbit around Neptune. This is illustrated on the diagram in relation to other irregular satellites of Neptune. The satellites above the horizontal axis are prograde, the satellites beneath it are retrograde. The yellow segments extend from the pericentre to the apocentre, showing the eccentricity. It is also worth mentioning that Sao and Laomedeia are similar to Halimede but they both have prograde orbits unlike Halimede which has a retrograde orbit.

Physical characteristics
Halimede is about 62 kilometers in diameter (assuming an albedo of 0.04) and appears neutral (grey) in the visible light. Given the very similar colour of the satellite to that of Nereid together with the high probability (41%) of collision in the past lifespan of the Solar System, it has been suggested that the satellite could be a fragment of Nereid.

References

External links 

 Matthew Holman's Neptune's page
 David Jewitt's pages
 Neptune's Known Satellites (by Scott S. Sheppard)
 MPC: Natural Satellites Ephemeris Service
 Mean orbital parameters from JPL

Moons of Neptune
Irregular satellites
 
20020814
Moons with a retrograde orbit